Omam may refer to:
 Of Mice and Men, a 1937 novella by John Steinbeck.
 Trachyspermum ammi, a plant
 Of Monsters And Men, an Icelandic band
 Omam, Iran, a village